Turkmenistan First League (Turkmen: Türkmenistan Birinji Ligasy) is the second highest football league in Turkmenistan. The division is run by Football Association of Turkmenistan. It is split in 4 provincial zones.

League
Turkmenistan League